Cristopher Javier Mansilla Almonacid (24 May 1990 – 10 May 2021) was a Chilean track and road cyclist.

Biography
He competed in the omnium event at the 2012 UCI Track Cycling World Championships. He was also qualified to start in the madison event but did not start.

Mansilla died at age 30 from COVID-19 in Puerto Natales on 10 May 2021, during the COVID-19 pandemic in Chile.

Major results

2008
 1st  Team sprint, Pan American Track Championships
2009
 3rd  Team sprint, Pan American Track Championships
2010
 National Under-23 Road Championships
2nd Time trial
3rd Road race
2011
 Pan American Track Championships
1st  Madison (with Antonio Cabrera)
2nd  Scratch
 1st Stage 11 Vuelta Ciclista de Chile
2012
 1st  Madison, Pan American Track Championships (with Antonio Cabrera)
 Vuelta Ciclista de Chile
1st Stages 1 (TTT) & 8
2013
 Rutas de América
1st Stages 3 & 4
 3rd  Omnium, Bolivarian Games
2014
 Pan American Track Championships
2nd  Omnium
3rd  Scratch
2015
 1st  Sprints classification, Vuelta a Venezuela
 1st Stage 7b Doble Bragado
 
1st Stages 3 & 4
 3rd  Scratch, Pan American Track Championships
2016
 1st Stage 2 Doble Bragado
 8th Tour of Yancheng Coastal Wetlands
2018
 3rd  Road race, Pan American Road Championships

References

External links
 
 

1990 births
2021 deaths
Chilean track cyclists
Chilean male cyclists
Cyclists at the 2011 Pan American Games
Cyclists at the 2015 Pan American Games
Pan American Games competitors for Chile
People from Punta Arenas
Deaths from the COVID-19 pandemic in Chile
20th-century Chilean people
21st-century Chilean people